Zanotto is a surname. Notable people with the surname include:

Deone Zanotto, Australian actress, singer and dancer
Edgar D. Zanotto, Brazilian engineer
Juan Zanotto (1935–2005), Argentine comic book artist
Kendra Zanotto (born 1981), American swimmer

See also 
 Zanotti